Patriarch John II may refer to:

 Patriarch John II Codonatus of Antioch (ruled in 476–477)
 Pope John I (II) of Alexandria (Patriarch John II of Alexandria), ruled in 496–505
 Pope John II (III) of Alexandria (Patriarch John III of Alexandria), ruled in 505–516
 John II, Maronite Patriarch (designation contended among various people)